Crassispira starri is an extinct species of sea snail, a marine gastropod mollusk in the family Pseudomelatomidae, the turrids and allies.
mollusk in the family

Description
The length of the shell attains 10 mm, its diameter 8.4 mm.

Distribution
Fossils have been found in Miocene strata in Baja California, Mexico; age range: 23.03 to 15.97 Ma

References

 L. G. Hertlein. 1927. Paleontology of the Miocene of Lower California. Proceedings of the Academy of Sciences 16(19):605-647

starri
Gastropods described in 1927